Cipayung is a district (kecamatan) of East Jakarta, Indonesia, situated in the southeastern part of Jakarta, in the outskirts of Jakarta. Its northern boundary is Pondok Gede Raya Road, its eastern boundary is Sunter River to the East, and its western boundary is Jagorawi Tollway. Marshes can still be found in Cipayung.

There are several recreation places located in Cipayung, including Taman Mini Indonesia Indah, Cibubur scouting complex, and the PKI Betrayal Museum.

Kelurahan (administrative villages)
Cipayung is divided into eight kelurahan or "administrative villages":
Lubang Buaya - area code 13810
Ceger - area code 13820
Cipayung - area code 13840
Munjul - area code 13850
Pondok Ranggon - area code 13860
Cilangkap - area code 13870
Setu - area code 13880
Bambu Apus - area code 13890

List of important places

Arboretum botanical forest
Museum Pengkhianatan PKI ("PKI Betrayal Museum")
Pancasila Sakti or Pahlawan Revolusi (Indonesian "Revolution Heroes") Monument
Scout's camping ground and recreation area (Bumi Perkemahan dan Graha Wisata Pramuka)
Taman Mini Indonesia Indah
Indonesian National Badminton Team Headquarters

Pondok Ranggon Flood Control Lakes
In March 2014, construction started on three flood control lakes were built, predicted to be operational before end of the year. Pondok Ranggon Lake I is 11.5 hectares, Lake II is 5 hectares, while Lake III is 2 hectares. The lakes have a total capacity of 550,000. The lakes and surrounding area will be used as recreational area with a garden and pathway.

References

Districts of Jakarta
East Jakarta